Steel belts are a type of conveyor belt used in many industries such as food, chemical, wood processing  and transportation.

Description 
Steel belts are generally made from carbon steel or stainless steel. Stainless steel belts are corrosion-resistant, an important surface quality. Stainless steel belts are used primarily in the chemical, food, rubber, plastic, wood, and laminate industries. Carbon steel belts are energy efficient and ideal for applications necessitating radiant heating of products or in high-temperature applications that might exceed the annealing temperatures of less heat-resistant stainless steel belts. Carbon steel belts provide the added advantage of even more heat distribution than provided by most stainless steel alloys. Carbon steel belts are used primarily in food processing, transport, and bake ovens. Textured steel is also commonly used when a non-stick surface is required, as in the laminate industry.

Single and double belt systems 
The two main systems using steel belts are single-belt and double-belt systems. Single-belt systems are appropriate for manufacturing single-sided products such as pastilles, flakes, strips, and sheets. The double-belt system offers simultaneous processing of both the top and bottom of a product, such as chemical, rubber, laminate, and composite material processing operations.

Types

Ground 
Normally, ground stainless steel belts are produced with surface roughness ranging from Ra 0.4μm down to 0.1μm, with well-rounded edges, and optimized for level and straight contour. Such belts are supplied in open lengths, with the ends prepared for welding on site, or in endless condition with a welded joint.

Perforated
Perforated steel belts enable the drying media, for example hot air, to be transferred 'through' the belt, so that the air is in contact with all parts of the product on the belt. Normally, manufacturers offer perforated belts with five standard perforation patterns which cover most requirements. A broad range of other patterns, with a minimum hole diameter of 0.8 mm (0.03 in.) and different spacing, can be provided to suit specific applications.

Polished
Super-mirror-polished stainless-steel belts to produce several types of thin film and ceramic sheets. The belts are available in thickness from 0.60 to 2.00 mm (0.02362 to 0.0787 in.) with thickness variation less than or equal to 80 μm. Polished steel belts are produced endless or as open-length belts.

Seamless
Seamless steel belts are suitable to produce of high-quality plastic foils and films such as optical film and packaging film. Thickness normally ranges from 0.03 to 0.60 mm (0.012 to 0.23 inch). Seamless steel belts are suitable for machines with narrow drum diameters using wide belts.

Solid
Solid stainless-steel belts are, as standard, delivered in cold-rolled condition with a mill finish of Ra < 0.4 μm and have well-rounded edges. Carbon steel belts are, as standard, delivered in a hardened and tempered condition with a mill finish of Ra < 0.4 μm and have well-rounded edges. Solid steel belts are leveled and straightened to obtain optimal flatness and straightness and are supplied in open lengths, with the ends prepared for welding on site, or in endless condition with a welded joint.

Material 
The material is a special grade for carbon or stainless steel specifically designed for use as a steel belt, with the material specially alloyed or treated to have improved properties such ductility, strength, thermal conductivity etc. depending on the application.

Sizes 
Steel belts are available in a range of sizes ranging typically from 400mm wide x 0.6 mm thick to around 3,000 mm wide x 3.0 mm thick. There are special applications that may use belts of narrower and thinner or wider and thicker size, but these are not common. The length of the belts are typically in the range 10 m to 100 m long, however it is theoretically possible to produce a belt of unlimited length by joining of shorter belts sections.

Usage

Food industry

Steel belts that are used in the food industry are designed to be hygienic, easy to clean, reliable and versatile in use. They are used during cooking, steaming and drying of perishables, freeze drying of instant coffee, casting caramel and candy, and forming of chocolate droplets.

Chemical industry

Stainless-steel belts are an integral part of continuous production processes. Unlike conveyor belts used purely for transportation purposes, steel belts used in this industry serve as media for transferring heat and/or pressure. Applications for steel belts in the chemical industry include casting, polymerizing of resins, waxes, paraffins and many other substances.

Transportation

Steel belts may be used to move the finished product or raw material or in parcel sorting systems, transporting of bottles, bulk loads, bricks, machinery parts and the like. Straight tracking, high abrasion resistance, and dynamic fatigue strength are crucial when transporting bulky material or unit load. Extremely high operating speeds cause a high number of load cycles and create severe operating conditions. Steel belts can be made to suit these extreme requirements.

Wood processing

Steel belts play an essential role in modern, continuous production processes for wood-based panels (WBP) such as particle boards, OSB- and MDF boards, where they serve as heat and pressure transfer media at the same time. As the steel belt surface has a direct influence on the final panel surface quality, this application imposes high demands on steel belts regarding thickness uniformity and surface finish.

Advantages and disadvantages

Cost

Compared to other materials like a plastic belt, the steel belt is more expensive. However, the steel belt production price per linear foot is lower compared to a plastic belt. Furthermore, the steel belt has a low cost of process compared to the plastic belt, and is not derived from petroleum products.

Durability

Steel belts can withstand sustained exposure to extreme temperatures and vacuum. Many are engineered to withstand stresses such as bending, heating, and cooling. A variety of alloys may be used, each with its own resistance to chemicals, humidity, and corrosion. Engineers generally select a belt material based on physical properties, availability, and cost.

Maintenance

Usually, the steel belt's maintenance on steel belt conveyor system. The steel belt conveyor system including the resolving of belt tracking problems and changing of spares and consumables.

Ease of repair

Normally, a steel belt will deform over time. The steel belt's curvature can be flattened by various methods. The most familiar solution for the steel belt's cross curvature is shot peening, which can offer a quick, onsite, cost-effective method of flattening out deformed steel belts without interrupting production.

References

Steel
Industrial processes